Riomar is locality in the north of Barranquilla city, Colombia. It gets its name from its proximity with the Caribbean Sea and the Magdalena River. Its boundaries are the "Calle 84" and the "Carrera 46".

List of barrios
The locality has 25 neighborhoods and one township. Is manage for a local mayor and an Administrative Local Board integrate for 15 councilors.

References

Barranquilla